Ek Takar Bou is Bangladeshi romantic film directed by P.A. Kajol. The star-cast of the film are Shakib Khan, Shabnur, Romana and many more. This film was released in 80 cinema halls at a time in Eid festival.

Plot
Sisters Kajal and Kiran love their cousin Raj. Raj jokes with the two sisters about love. Kiran spends the whole day with Raj's father Shaukat Chowdhury and calls him baba. On the other hand, Kajal works as Raj's assistant in his office. They have an office romance at the office, which leads to marriage without telling anyone in the family at the register office. A few days after the wedding, Kajal learns that her uncle is arranging Raj and Kiran's marriage. Thinking about her younger sister's happiness, Kajal leaves the house with a drama of marrying Mohabbat.

A daughter is born to Kajol. She lives with him in a small house. One day Kajol's daughter Dighi came in front of Raj's car. Friendship begins between them. Raj often visits Dighi. In this way, one day he gets to know the real identity of Dighi.

Cast
 Shakib Khan
 Shabnur
 Rumana
 Razzak
 Kabila
 Prarthona Fardin Dighi
 C. B. Zaman

Production

Soundtrack
The songs of this film was composed by Shawkat Ali Emon and lyrics were penned by Kabir Bakul. Background score of this film were composed by Alauddin Ali.

"Aula Premer Baula Batash" - Baby Naznin, Monir Khan
"Mon Dilam Pran Dilam" - Runa Laila, Kumar Bishwajit
"Ekta Nouka Kine Dibo" - Agun
"Bhalobasha Bhalobasha Thako Tumi Dure" - Kanak Chapa
"O Little Friend" - Sabina Yasmin and Andrew Kishore

Awards
Meril Prothom Alo Awards- 2008
Public Choice Awards for Best Film Actress-Shabnur

References

External links
 Ek Takar Bou on BMDb

2008 films
Bengali-language Bangladeshi films
Bangladeshi romantic comedy films
2008 romantic comedy films
Films scored by Alauddin Ali
Films scored by Shawkat Ali Emon
2000s Bengali-language films